614 Pia is a minor planet orbiting the Sun between Mars and Jupiter in the asteroid belt.
August Kopff discovered 614 Pia on 11 October 1906 at Heidelberg, Germany.

The Name
Its name may have been inspired by the Pia Observatory at Trieste, Italy, which German astronomer Johann Nepomuk Krieger (1865–1902) named for his wife, Pia.  Pia is Italian for "pious."

References

External links
 
 

Background asteroids
Pia
Pia
C-type asteroids (SMASS)
19061011